Advances in Applied Mathematics is a peer-reviewed mathematics journal publishing research on applied mathematics. Its founding editor was Gian-Carlo Rota (Massachusetts Institute of Technology); from 1980 to 1999, Joseph P. S. Kung (University of North Texas) served as managing editor. It is currently published by Elsevier with eight issues per year and edited by Hal Schenck (Auburn University) and Catherine Yan (Texas A&M University).

Abstracting and indexing 
The journal is abstracted and indexed by:
 ACM Guide to Computing Literature
 CompuMath Citation Index
 Current Contents/Physics, Chemical, & Earth Sciences
 Mathematical Reviews
 Science Citation Index
 Scopus
According to the Journal Citation Reports, the journal has a 2020 impact factor of 0.848.

See also 
 List of periodicals published by Elsevier

References

External links 
 

Mathematics journals
Publications established in 1980
English-language journals
Elsevier academic journals
8 times per year journals